Corey Harbison (born April 11, 1986) is an American politician who has served in the Alabama House of Representatives from the 12th district since 2014.

References

1986 births
Living people
Republican Party members of the Alabama House of Representatives
21st-century American politicians